David Lyle Boren (born April 21, 1941) is a retired American lawyer and politician from Oklahoma. A member of the Democratic Party, he served as 21st governor of Oklahoma from 1975 to 1979 and three terms in the United States Senate from 1979 to 1994. A conservative Democrat, to date, he is the last in his party to have served as U.S. Senator from Oklahoma. He was the 13th and second-longest serving president of the University of Oklahoma from 1994 to 2018. He was the longest serving chairman of the Senate Select Committee on Intelligence. On September 20, 2017, Boren officially announced his retirement as president of the University of Oklahoma, effective June 30, 2018.

Early life and career
Boren was born in Washington, D.C., the son of Christine (née McKown) and Lyle Hagler Boren. He graduated in 1963 from Yale University, where he majored in American history, graduated in the top one percent of his class and was elected to Phi Beta Kappa. He was a member of the Yale Conservative Party, Cannon and Castle ROTC Honor Society, elected president of the Yale Political Union and is a member of Skull and Bones.  He was selected as a Rhodes Scholar and earned a master's degree in Philosophy, Politics, and Economics from University of Oxford (1965), serving later as a member of the Rhodes Scholarship selection committee.

In 1966 Boren defeated fellow Democrat William C. Wantland in a primary election and Clifford Conn Jr. in the general election to win a seat in the Oklahoma House of Representatives, where he served four terms, 1967 to 1975.  In 1968, he received a J.D. degree from the University of Oklahoma College of Law.

While serving in the House, Boren was a member of the committee that investigated the University of Oklahoma after the school allowed black militant Paul Boutelle, a socialist and anti-Vietnam War activist, to give a speech there. During his House tenure Boren was also a professor at Oklahoma Baptist University.

Boren served in the Oklahoma Army National Guard from 1963 to 1974.  He attained the rank of captain and served as commander of the 2120th Supply & Service Company in Wewoka.

Governor

In 1974, Boren ran for governor. In keeping with the anti-establishment movements of that Watergate scandal-era campaign season, Boren's effort included the "Boren Broom Brigade" to demonstrate his pledge to "sweep out the Old Guard" and bring fundamental reforms to state government.

Boren and Congressman Clem McSpadden defeated incumbent David Hall in the primary election and moved into a runoff for the Democratic nomination.   Boren beat McSpadden in the runoff and subsequently defeated Republican Jim Inhofe in the general election. Coincidentally, Inhofe would go on to be his successor in the United States Senate in the 1994 special election after his resignation.

During his tenure Boren worked on: eliminating the inheritance tax for property left by one spouse to another; a reduction in the state income tax rate; improvements to the state corrections program in the wake of the 1973 Oklahoma State Penitentiary riot; and elimination of more than a hundred state agencies, commissions, and boards.  Boren attracted national attention during the Energy Crisis when he advocated nationwide deregulation of natural gas prices.

Boren opted not to run for reelection in 1978, instead running for the United States Senate seat held by the retiring Dewey Bartlett.  He won a multi-candidate primary with 46 percent of the vote to second-place finisher Ed Edmondson's 28 percent. Boren then defeated Edmondson in the runoff, and Republican Robert Kamm, former President of Oklahoma State University, in the general election.

Accusations in 1978 U.S. Senate Campaign
During his 1978 U.S. Senate campaign  while holding the office of Governor, Boren's main rival for the Democratic party's nomination, former U.S. Rep Ed Edmondson, called Boren "a Republican" due to a Boren policy as Governor which eliminated the state tax for inheritances between spouses. Edmondson took a pledge recited on a biography of President Harry Truman, that he was not nor had never been "a Republican."

Another of Boren's primary opponents was Anthony Points, who ran under an assumed name, had faced charges of passing bogus checks, and accused Boren of being gay. Following his victory, Boren swore an oath on a family Bible, declaring "I know what homosexuals and bisexuals are. I further swear that I am not a homosexual or bisexual. And I further swear that I have never been a homosexual or bisexual. And I further swear that I have never engaged in any homosexual or bisexual activities nor do I approve of or condone them."

Despite the personal attacks which made The Washington Post describe the race as a "Gutter Shootout"  Boren prevailed by wide margins in the primary, runoff and general election balloting.

U.S. Senator

In the U.S. Senate, Boren was known as a centrist or conservative Democrat, and was a protégé of Texas Sen. Lloyd Bentsen and was often aligned with southern Democrats Sam Nunn of Georgia and Howell Heflin of Alabama.  He was a strong advocate of tax cuts across the board as the cornerstone of economic policy. He opposed the Windfall profit tax on the domestic oil industry, which was repealed in 1988. At one point, the tax was generating no revenue, yet still required oil companies to comply with reporting requirements and the IRS to spend $15 million to collect the tax. Of the tax, Boren said:  "As long as the tax is not being collected, the accounting requirements are needless. They result in heavy burdens for the private sector and unnecessary cost to the taxpayer."	

Sen. Barry Goldwater (R-AZ), who served with him, publicly stated that Boren should be elected president.  Boren's chief of staff was a respected Capitol Hill insider, Charles Ward, a former longtime administrative assistant to Speaker Albert.

Boren served on the Senate Committee on Finance and the Committee on Agriculture, Nutrition and Forestry. He also served as chairman of the Senate Select Committee on Intelligence from 1987 to 1993. His six years is the longest tenure for a Senate Intelligence Committee chairman, tied with Dianne Feinstein. Boren sponsored the National Security Education Act of 1991, which established the National Security Education Program.

Boren was one of only two Democratic senators to vote in favor of the controversial nomination of Robert Bork to the Supreme Court, in 1987. Boren also decided in 1991 to vote against the Persian Gulf War.
Boren was one of President Bill Clinton's top choices to replace Les Aspin as a U.S. Secretary of Defense in 1994. However, Clinton selected William J. Perry instead.

In a controversial public mea culpa in a New York Times Op/Ed piece, Boren expressed regret over his vote to confirm Supreme Court Associate Justice Clarence Thomas. Partly as a result of that statement, The Daily Oklahoman, the largest newspaper in Oklahoma, which had encouraged and endorsed Boren's entire career, began intensely criticizing him.

His opposition in 1993 was essential for the failure of a heat content based (for example British thermal unit or joule) energy tax proposed by the Clinton Administration as means to curb the deficit and reduce pollution.

In 1994, he resigned his Senate seat to accept the presidency of the University of Oklahoma.
As of 2021, he is the last Democrat to serve as a U.S. Senator from Oklahoma.

Praise from Nelson Mandela
As chairman of the U.S. Senate Select Committee on Intelligence, Boren was instrumental in building consensus and bipartisan support for the U.S. State Department initiatives to promote democracy abroad which helped lead to the release of Nelson Mandela. Boren was praised and received a standing ovation led by Mandela at a special broadcast of ABC News Nightline with Ted Koppel, which commemorated Mandela's historic release from prison in South Africa. During his first visit to the US after his release, Mandela was a dinner guest of Boren and wife Molly.

Post-Senate career 
Boren served as president of the University of Oklahoma until June 30, 2018, and was succeeded by business executive Jim Gallogly.  He has also served on the Board of Directors of Texas Instruments and AMR Corporation (then parent company of American Airlines). As of 2017, his salary as president of the University of Oklahoma was $383,852.88 annually.  One semester every school year, Boren taught a freshman level political science class to 200 students.

In 1996, Reform Party presidential candidate Ross Perot unsuccessfully sought Boren to be his vice-presidential running mate. In 2001, Boren, along with fellow Democrat former governor George Nigh was listed as being in support of the Right to Work law in Oklahoma. The measure, proposed and sponsored by then Gov. Frank Keating, was passed by the voters.

Boren is regarded as a mentor to former director of Central Intelligence George Tenet from his days as chairman of the Senate Intelligence Committee. On the morning of September 11, 2001, Boren and Tenet were having breakfast together when Tenet was called away to respond to the terror attacks.  Boren said that in the weeks before the Iraq War began in March 2003, he warned Tenet that since he was not a member of President George W. Bush's closest circle of advisers, the White House would make him the scapegoat if things went badly in Iraq. "I told him they had your name circled if anything goes wrong," Boren recalls telling Tenet.

In June 2007, conservative political columnist Robert Novak claimed that Boren had met with New York Mayor Michael Bloomberg to discuss a possible third-party presidential campaign. Bloomberg had recently left the Republican Party, and speculation arose that he discussed the possibility of Boren joining him as a running mate. However, on April 18, 2008, Boren endorsed the leading Democratic candidate, Sen. Barack Obama of Illinois.

In 2008, he released a book titled A Letter to America.

Boren and former U.S. senator Chuck Hagel served as co-chairmen of the nonpartisan U.S. President's Intelligence Advisory Board under Barack Obama.  He sits on the honorary board of the National Association for Urban Debate Leagues.  He was inducted into the Oklahoma Hall of Fame in 1988. In 1996, Boren received the Foreign Language Advocacy Award from the Northeast Conference on the Teaching of Foreign Languages in recognition of his support for education and his authorship of the National Security Education Act of 1992.

Sigma Alpha Epsilon incident

In March 2015, a recording was made public of members of the University of Oklahoma's Sigma Alpha Epsilon fraternity singing a racially derogatory song which used the racial slur "N-word" and included reference to lynching and racial segregation. As university president, Boren appeared widely in US media and condemned the behavior, expelled two student members of the fraternity, and with the fraternity's national headquarters' help, ordered the OU chapter's closure. He also created a mandatory Diversity Training for the whole campus. Some legal scholars have argued that these expulsions were improper, as speech, even if offensive, is protected by the First Amendment to the U.S. Constitution. Other scholars have argued that the expulsion was based on the student code of conduct, and was not protected.

2019 Sexual Misconduct Scandal
On February 13, 2019, it was reported that the University of Oklahoma had hired the Jones Day law firm to investigate Boren after allegations of his "serious" misconduct arose at the university.  The university and specifically the OU Board of Regents declined to specify whether the investigation was actually of Boren, or to specify its start or projected end date, instead referring to it generally as an ongoing personnel investigation. Oklahoma State Bureau of Investigation conducted a  criminal investigation which lasted a year ending with no charges.

Six witnesses described sexual harassment interactions with Boren, shortly after the end of his 24-year tenure as the institution's president. University of Oklahoma regents received the findings of that Title IX investigation in April 2019, conducted by the law firm Jones Day, and turned it over to the Oklahoma State Bureau of Investigation for the agency's  criminal investigation which lasted a year ending with no charges. Only a portion of the Title IX report has been released publicly to accuser and former OU student Jess Eddy, whose allegations were deemed "generally credible" by the law firm though Eddy admitted to "calling Boren personally and asking for financial compensation after The Oklahoman first reported Boren was being investigated."   The four-page section released by OU referenced "six witnesses" who discussed interactions with Boren. Boren's successor, James L. Gallogly who ordered investigations of Boren, resigned May 12, 2019 after ten months in office.

The investigation purportedly sought to determine whether Boren sexually harassed staff or students during his tenure as president.  The allegations arose from a Fall 2010 Boren fundraising trip to Houston in a private jet and hotel events afterward. During the investigation, OU graduate and former Boren classroom aide Jess Eddy made his allegation of Boren's sexual misconduct public through media interviews.  Boren has issued a blanket denial of any misconduct or illegal activity through his attorney.

Boren's attorney has stated that the investigation is "not an objective search for truth," and an attempted character assassination on Boren without basis in fact, adding that "Boren was unaware of any allegations until he heard about it in the press." Boren's attorney also stated that current OU President James L. Gallogly told a Vice President of the University of Oklahoma to deliver the message to Boren that "I am the meanest son of a bitch he has ever seen, and if he ever crosses me again, I will destroy him," after Boren wrote an op-ed defending the state of OU's finances in response to Gallogly's assertion that they were in disorder following Boren's tenure as president.

The University of Oklahoma regents received the results of the investigation in April 2019, and although they did not release any of the findings, the chairwoman described the probe as "fair, non-biased, thorough and objective." Boren accuser Jess Eddy has admitted to "calling Boren personally and asking for financial compensation after The Oklahoman first reported Boren was being investigated." Eddy responded to the non-disclosure of the findings by calling for the report by Jones Day to be released.

Personal life
He has been married twice. His first marriage to Janna Little, daughter of Reuel Little, occurred shortly after his graduation in 1968.  They had two children, and divorced in 1976. He married Pontotoc County Special District Judge Molly W. Shi on November 27, 1977. It was the first time an Oklahoma Governor had married while in office. Shi was a native of Ada, Oklahoma and alumna of East Central University and the University of Oklahoma, where she earned her degree in law. She was a lawyer in private practice for two years before being appointed as a judge. His daughter, Carrie, is a former actress and current director for evangelism in the Episcopal Diocese of Dallas.

The Boren family has a strong interest in public policy and three generations of public service. His father, Lyle Boren, served in the U.S. House of Representatives (OK-04) from 1937 to 1947. His son, Dan Boren, served in the U.S. House of Representatives (OK-02) from 2005 to 2013.

Boren is the first cousin of singer, songwriter, and actor Hoyt Axton, best known for writing the song "Joy to the World."

See also
Boren–McCurdy proposals

Notes

References

External links

 Encyclopedia of Oklahoma History and Culture - Boren, David
Voices of Oklahoma interview with David L. Boren. First person interview conducted on March 24, 2016, with David L. Boren.

|-

|-

|-

|-

|-

|-

|-

|-

1941 births
20th-century Members of the Oklahoma House of Representatives
American Airlines people
American Rhodes Scholars
American United Methodists
Bethesda-Chevy Chase High School alumni
Boren family
Democratic Party governors of Oklahoma
Democratic Party members of the Oklahoma House of Representatives
Democratic Party United States senators from Oklahoma
Living people
National Guard (United States) officers
Oklahoma Baptist University faculty
Oklahoma lawyers
People from Washington, D.C.
Presidents of the University of Oklahoma
University of Oklahoma College of Law alumni
Writers from Oklahoma
Writers from Washington, D.C.
Yale College alumni